Abdullah Al-Hassan (born 6 April 1999) is a Saudi Arabian professional footballer who plays as a right-back for Al-Faisaly.

Career
Al-Hassan began his career at the youth team of Al-Faisaly He arrived for the first team in 2019 .He played his first match against Al-Shabab and participated as a substitute for Khalid Al-Ghamdi . On 22 January 2022, Al-Hassan joined Al-Jabalain on loan.

Honours

Club
Al-Faisaly
King Cup: 2020–21

References

External links 
 

1999 births
Living people
Saudi Arabian footballers
Al-Faisaly FC players
Al-Jabalain FC players
Saudi Professional League players
Saudi First Division League players
Association football fullbacks